Jamie Boggs (nee Pootrakul) is the current director of athletics for Grand Canyon University. She previously served as a senior associate athletic director at Georgia State University from 2011 to 2014, and as an assistant athletic director at Duke University from 2003 to 2010. Boggs attended college at the University of San Diego, graduating in 1999 with a Bachelor of Arts in Psychology. She later attended the University of Arizona's James E. Rogers College of Law, graduating with a Juris Doctor in 2002. Boggs was named interim athletic director at Grand Canyon University on August 12, 2019, before being elevated to permanent athletic director on April 26, 2021.

References

External links
 
Grand Canyon bio

Living people
Grand Canyon Antelopes athletic directors
University of Arizona alumni
University of San Diego alumni
Women college athletic directors in the United States
Year of birth missing (living people)